Kempen may refer to:

Places
 Kempen (Dutch/Belgian region), also called Kempenland or Campine
 Kempen, Germany, a town in North Rhine-Westphalia, Germany
 Kempen Airport, Budel, Netherlands
 Kępno, Greater Poland Voivodeship, Poland

Other uses
 Harry Kempen (1937–2000), Dutch cultural psychologist
 Van Kempen, a surname
 Van Lanschot Kempen, a Dutch management firm

See also
 Kreis Kempen (disambiguation)